Ure Dam is a gravity dam in the Aichi Prefecture of Japan. 6 houses were flooded in the building of the dam.

References

External links

Dams in Aichi Prefecture
Dams completed in 1958